Muskeg River is a locality in northern Alberta, Canada within the Municipal District of Greenview No. 16.

Geography

The Muskeg River flows through the community and north into the Smoky River.

See also 
List of communities in Alberta
List of settlements in Alberta

References 

Localities in the Municipal District of Greenview No. 16